Zhang Yunsong (born 20 March 1977) is a Chinese basketball player who competed in the 2004 Summer Olympics.

References

1977 births
Living people
Beijing Ducks players
Chinese men's basketball players
Olympic basketball players of China
Basketball players at the 2004 Summer Olympics
Basketball players from Beijing